Maliha is a feminine given name. The name definitely stems from the Arabic adjective singular "malāḥah مَلَاحَة" which the plural variant form is "malīḥ مَليح" or "milāḥ مِلَاح", meaning "state of being gorgeous or graceful" or "state of beauty, grace, elegance".

People with the name include:
 Maliha Ali Asghar Khan, Pakistani politician
 Maliha Hussein (born 1974), Pakistani cricketer
 Maliha Khatun (died 2002), Bangladeshi educationist, writer and social worker
 Maliha Masood (born 1972), American writer
Maliha Zulfacar (born 1961), Afghan university professor

See also
Malha, neighborhood in Jerusalem, formerly a village known as al-Maliha
Al-Malihah, town in Rif Dimashq Governorate, Syria (Arabic: المليحة)

Pakistani feminine given names
Urdu feminine given names